Pärt Uusberg (born 16 December 1986) is an Estonian composer, conductor, and actor. He is the chief conductor of Chamber Choir Head Ööd, Vend. He played Joosep in the film The Class.

Uusberg was born in Rapla. He has two brothers - Uku Uusberg is an actor and Andero Uusberg is a psychologist. His father Valter Uusberg is an animation director and mother Urve Uusberg is also a conductor and a psychologist.

Selected filmography

Risttuules (2014)
Oleg (2010)
Klass (2007)

External links

1986 births
Estonian male film actors
Estonian conductors (music)
Living people
Male composers
21st-century conductors (music)
21st-century Estonian composers
21st-century Estonian male actors
21st-century male musicians
People from Rapla